Trialeurodes abutiloneus or the banded-wing whitefly is a species of whitefly of the genus Trialeurodes first described by Haldeman in 1850.

T. abutiloneus is a plant pest in its own right and a vector for Abutilon yellows virus and Sweet potato chlorotic stunt virus.

References

Whiteflies
Insects described in 1850